Woollarawarre Bennelong ( 1764 – 3 January 1813), also spelt Baneelon, was a senior man of the Eora, an Aboriginal Australian  people of the Port Jackson area, at the time of the first British settlement in Australia in 1788. Bennelong served as an interlocutor between the Eora and the British, both in the colony of New South Wales and in the United Kingdom.

Personal details 
Woollarawarre Bennelong, the son of Goorah-Goorah and Gagolh, was a member of the Wangal clan, connected with the south side of Parramatta River, having close ties with the Wallumedegal clan, on the west side of the river, and the Burramattagal clan near today's Parramatta. He had several sisters, Wariwéar, Karangarang, Wûrrgan and Munânguri, who married important men from nearby clans, thereby creating political links for their brother.

He had five names, given at different times during the various ritual inductions he underwent. The other four are given as Wolarrebarre, Wogultrowe, Boinba, and Bundabunda. The island of Memel in Port Jackson was part of his personal property, inherited through his father. He had several wives: the first, whose name is not known, died, probably from smallpox, before he was captured. He then married the Cammeray clanswoman Barangaroo, who died shortly after in 1791. He then took up with a Gweagal woman, Kurubarabüla, after kidnapping her, and they stayed together a year until his departure for England. On his return, he had a son, Dicky, by another woman. His last wife, who was buried with him, was Boorong.

Capture and life in the British settlement 

Bennelong was brought to the settlement at Sydney Cove in November 1789 by order of the governor, Arthur Phillip, who was under instructions from King George III to establish relationships with the indigenous populations. At that time the Eora conscientiously avoided contact with the newcomers, and in desperation Phillip resorted to kidnapping. A man named Arabanoo was captured, but he, like many other Aboriginal people near the settlement, died in a smallpox epidemic a few months later in May 1789.
Bennelong (married at the time to Barangaroo) was captured with Colebee (married to Daringa) on 25 November 1789 as part of Phillip's plan to learn the language and customs of the local people. William Bradley painted a watercolour of the occasion and described the capture in his journal as the 'most unpleasant service' he was ever ordered to undertake. Bennelong's age, at the time of his capture, was estimated at 25, and he was described as being 'of good stature, stoutly made', with a 'bold, intrepid countenance'. His appetite was such that 'the ration of a week was insufficient to have kept him for a day', and 'love and war seemed his favourite pursuits'.

Colebee soon escaped, but Bennelong stayed in the settlement for several months, then slipped away. Four months later, he was sighted by officers in Manly Cove, and Phillip was notified. One account has it that, on the day Phillip had organized a whale feast in order to reestablish relations with the Eora, the Governor hurried over and approached Bennelong, who was with a group of roughly 20 warriors. Phillip took a gesture by Bennelong towards another Aboriginal person, Willemering, as an invitation for an introduction, and extended his hand to the latter, who responded by spearing Phillip in the shoulder. A scuffle broke out, but the officers managed to lead the Governor away to safety.

Willemering was a Kurdaitcha from Broken Bay, and it has been suggested by some historians that he had been enlisted by Bennelong to carry out payback for the latter's sense of personal injury on having been kidnapped. In this view, some form of atonement was necessary as a prelude to any further arrangements with the colonists. Phillip ordered that no retaliation take place and Bennelong, some days later, turned up to visit him as he was recovering from the wound, and their relationship was renewed.

He maintained ongoing good relations with the colony and in a gesture of kinship, bestowed upon Phillip the Aboriginal name Wolawaree. He learned to speak English.  In 1790, the governor built him a hut on what became known as Bennelong Point (now occupied by the Sydney Opera House).

Visit to England 
Bennelong and another Aboriginal man named Yemmerrawanne (or Imeerawanyee) travelled with Phillip on the Atlantic to England in 1792. Many historians have claimed that they were presented to King George III, but there is no direct evidence that this occurred. Soon after their arrival in England they were hurriedly made clothes that would have been suitable for their presentation to the King.

Jack Brook reconstructs some of their activities from the expense claims lodged with the government. They visited St Paul's Cathedral and the Tower of London. A boat was hired, and they went bathing. They went to the theatre. While in London they resided with Henry Waterhouse, and when Yemmerrawanne became sick, they moved to Eltham and resided at the house of Edward Kent, where they were tended by Mr and Mrs Phillips, and met Lord Sydney.

Yemmerrawanne died while in Britain after a serious chest infection, and Bennelong's health deteriorated. He returned to Sydney in Feb 1795 on HMS Reliance, the ship that took surgeon George Bass to the colony for the first time. Bass nursed him back to health and in exchange Bennelong taught him a sufficient amount of Dharuk to enable the former to communicate with the indigenous Eora on arriving in Sydney. Of the 2 years and 10 months he spent abroad, 18 months had been passed either at sea or on board ships in a dock.

Return to New South Wales 
Bennelong arrived back in Sydney on 7 September 1795. A letter he had drafted in 1796 to Mr and Mrs Phillips, thanking Mrs Phillips for caring for him in England, and asking for stockings and a handkerchief, is the first known text written in English by an Indigenous Australian.  Within a short time he took to the bush, reappearing only occasionally to dine at the servants' table in Governor King's residence. Many colonial reports complain of his refusal to rejoin 'polished society'. He frequently participated in payback battles, and officiated at ceremonies, including the last recorded initiation ceremony in Port Jackson in 1797. By the early 19th century, he was the leader of a 100-strong clan living on the north side of the river to the west of Kissing Point in Wallumedagal country.

Death 
He died on 3 January 1813 at Kissing Point on the Parramatta River in Sydney, and was buried in the orchard of the brewer James Squire, a friend to Bennelong and his clan. His death notice in the Sydney Gazette was dismissive, insisting that "...he was a thorough savage, not to be warped from the form and character that nature gave him...", which reflected the feelings of some in Sydney's white society that Bennelong had abandoned his role as ambassador in his last years, and also reflects the deteriorating relations between the two groups as more and more land was cleared and fenced for farming, and the hardening attitudes of many colonists towards 'savages' who were not willing to give up their country and become labourers and servants useful to the colonists.

Bennelong's people mourned his death with a traditional highly ritualized battle for which about two hundred people gathered. As a profound mark of respect, Colebee's nephew Nanberry, who died in 1821, asked to be buried with Bennelong at his request. Bidgee Bidgee, who led the Kissing Point clan for twenty years after Bennelong's death, also asked to be buried with Bennelong, but there is no record of his death or where he is buried.

On 20 March 2011, Peter Mitchell of Macquarie University announced that he had located the actual grave site in the garden of a private house in present-day Putney, New South Wales and stated that local Aboriginal authorities would be consulted about possible further exploration of the site. In November 2018, the New South Wales Government announced that it had bought the house and would turn the site into a public memorial to Bennelong, together with a museum commemorating the impact of European colonisation on the Indigenous peoples of the Sydney area.

Legacy 
Bennelong's legacy was long contested. Among many others, Manning Clark wrote:  "Bennelong disgusted his civilizers and became an exile from his own people". In recent decades, he has been defended, as someone who saw the best and worst of Western civilization and, having done so, rejected it. Bennelong's friendship with British colonists brought other Indigenous people into contact with the Sydney Cove colony. In contributing to some of the first cross-cultural communication between the groups, he helped establish a short period of relative peace between the two peoples.
 Bennelong Park is a small park next to Kissing Point in Putney, Sydney, near where Bennelong died.
 A small plaque in Cleves Park in Putney, Sydney, marks the area near where he was thought to be buried.
 Nearby on the south side of Parramatta River, Bennelong Bridge crosses Homebush Bay.
 The seat of Bennelong in the Federal parliament, which includes Putney, is named after him; Bennelong was the first Indigenous Australian to be honoured in the name of an electoral division.
 Bennelong Point, today the site of the Sydney Opera House, is named after him.
 An ostracod genus, Bennelongia has been named after him in 1981; this genus is endemic to Australia and New Zealand.

Portrayal 
Bennelong was played by actor Charles Yunupingu in the 1980 TV series The Timeless Land.

See also 
 Destiny in Sydney: An epic novel of convicts, Aborigines, and Chinese embroiled in the birth of Sydney, Australia
 Girt: An unofficial history of Australia by David Hunt
 Bangarra theater show about his first meeting with the white man

Notes

Citations

Sources

Further reading 
 

  [CC-By-SA]

1764 births
1813 deaths
Eora people
History of Australia (1788–1850)
18th-century Australian people